Shine: The Best of the Early Years is a compilation album by David Gray, released on 26 March 2007 in the UK and a day later in the US. The compilation contains tracks from Gray's first three albums and was released ahead of his Greatest Hits album released in November 2007.

Track listing

References

2007 compilation albums
David Gray (musician) albums
EMI Records compilation albums